Tooley's and Smart's Almshouses are Grade II listed almshouses in Ipswich which were founded in 1550 by Henry Tooley with a further endowment provided by William Smarte (MP) in 1591. They were rebuilt as a whole in 1846.

References

Buildings and structures in Ipswich
Almshouses in Suffolk
1550 establishments in England